Kevin John Lisch (born May 16, 1986) is an American professional basketball coach and former player who is an assistant coach for the Sydney Kings of the National Basketball League (NBL). He also holds an Italian passport and is an Australian citizen.

Lisch played college basketball for Saint Louis University (SLU), where he finished as the sixth-highest scorer in school history. After college, he made a name for himself in the NBL in Australia. He won an NBL championship and grand final MVP with the Perth Wildcats in his first professional season before winning the league MVP in 2012 and leading the Wildcats to another two grand finals in 2012 and 2013. He returned to the NBL in 2015 after two seasons playing in Europe, joining the Illawarra Hawks and winning his second league MVP. In 2016, he joined the Sydney Kings and made his debut for the Australian national team at the Rio Olympics. After four seasons playing with the Kings, he announced his retirement and moved into the assistant coach role.

Early life
Born and raised in Belleville, Illinois, Lisch attended Catholic schools as a youth, beginning with Blessed Sacrament for grade school, then Althoff Catholic High School. His faith was always important to him. He played basketball for Althoff Catholic and was often triple-defended on the court. Lisch was also a bright student, joining the student council and the National Honor Society. An all-state guard at Althoff, Lisch was twice named Belleville News-Democrat Player of the Year.

College career
Lisch continued on at a Catholic institute for college, joining Saint Louis University (SLU). At Saint Louis, Lisch played under coaches Brad Soderberg (2005–07) and Rick Majerus (2007–09) while earning a bachelor's degree in marketing and an MBA in four years.

As a freshman playing for the Billikens in 2005–06, Lisch was selected to the A-10 All-Rookie Team and was a three-time recipient of the A-10 Rookie of the Week award. He was the team's second-leading scorer at 11.1 points per game and top three-point shooter with 58 treys, which set the SLU freshman single-season record.

As a sophomore in 2006–07, Lisch was on the A-10 All-Defensive Team and earned honorable mention All-Conference selection. He was also named to the Shelby Classic All-Tournament team. He was second on the team and 13th in the A-10 with 14.9 points per game, and dealt a team-high 3.47 assists per game to rank eighth in the league. He led the team in assists in 19 games and was the top scorer 13 times—he scored in double figures in 26 games, including the last 14.

As a junior in 2007–08, Lisch was named third-team All-Conference and to the All-Defensive team. He was also voted to the Academic All-Conference squad and was selected to the Hispanic College Fund Challenge All-Tournament team. He led the team in scoring at 14.6 points per game, assists with 97 and steals with 38.

As a senior in 2008–09, Lisch was named ESPN The Magazine Academic All-American third team and was a first-team Academic All-District selection. He was chosen to the NABC All-District second team and voted the A-10 Men's Basketball Student-Athlete of the Year. He was also third-team All-Conference and was named to the Las Vegas Classic All-Tournament team. In 31 games as a senior, he averaged 14.1 points, 3.5 rebounds, 2.5 assists and 1.3 steals per game.

Lisch closed out his career in sixth place on SLU's scoring list with 1,687 points. His 325 assists rank ninth on the career chart and his 259 three-pointers are second only to the school-record 295 by Erwin Claggett. Lisch's 133 steals rank fifth at SLU also. As a result of his standout four-year tenure, Lisch was named to the Billikens' All-Century Team and was inducted into the SLU Hall of Fame.

Professional career

Perth Wildcats (2009–2013)

2009–10 season
In July 2009, Lisch signed with the Perth Wildcats of the Australian National Basketball League. He was swayed to come to Perth due to the close friendship between Billikens coach Rick Majerus and Wildcats coach Rob Beveridge. He struggled at the start of the 2009–10 season, and due to the high-profile imports traditionally signed by the Wildcats, some were calling for Lisch to be cut as early as the preseason tournament. Lisch debuted with a 12-point effort on September 25, 2009, against the Wollongong Hawks, and then had the game-winning, buzzer-beating 3-pointer the following game against the Townsville Crocodiles on October 2 to finish with 16 points. He scored in double figures in seven of his first eight games, including 21 points against the Melbourne Tigers on October 25, before registering 11 single-figure games throughout the rest of the season, including five straight games of under seven points between December 19 and January 8. To finish the regular season, he scored in double figures in four out of the final six games, including a 19-point effort in the regular-season finale on February 14 against the Crocodiles.

The Wildcats finished the regular season as minor premiers with a 17–11 record, and faced the Gold Coast Blaze in the semi-finals. Behind Lisch's 19 points in Game 1 and 18 points in Game 2, the Wildcats swept the Blaze to move on to the 2010 NBL Grand Final series, where they faced Wollongong. With the series tied at 1–1, Lisch took over in Game 3 to score a game-high and season-high 29 points with five 3-pointers in leading the Wildcats to the championship with a 96–72 victory over the Hawks. Lisch, who posted 15 points in Game 1 and 11 in Game 2, was named grand final MVP. Lisch appeared in all 33 games for the Wildcats in 2009–10, averaging 12.1 points, 2.7 rebounds and 2.3 assists per game.

2010–11 season
In April 2010, Lisch re-signed with the Wildcats for the 2010–11 NBL season. He reportedly knocked back a two-year contract offer in favour of a one-year deal. He had contemplated a move to Europe and was on the radar of several other NBL clubs. He came into the 2010–11 season sporting a more muscular tone, having bulked up for his second season after spending countless hours running and working out in the weights room. Lisch scored in double figures in all but nine games during the regular season, registering over 20 points three times. The Wildcats finished the regular season in fourth place with a 16–12 record, and faced the first-placed New Zealand Breakers in the semi-finals. Behind a 29-point effort, Lisch helped the Wildcats take Game 1 of the series in Auckland, before the Breakers came back to win Games 2 and 3. Lisch appeared in all 31 games for the Wildcats in 2010–11, averaging 13.5 points, 3.2 rebounds and 2.5 assists per game. He was named the team's co-MVP alongside Shawn Redhage.

2011–12 season
In May 2011, Lisch re-signed with the Wildcats on a two-year deal. He was quickly branded as the "best import in the league" by coach Rob Beveridge and he lived up to the tag over the first five rounds of the 2011–12 season. He averaged 22.0 points, 3.5 rebounds, 2.8 assists and 1.3 steals per game during the month of October, guiding the Wildcats to a 3–1 record. He was subsequently rewarded for his impressive start to the season with the NBL Player of the Month award for October. Lisch spent time as a ball handler early in the season in the absence of the injured Damian Martin, sharing the ball carrying role largely with co-captain Brad Robbins.

Lisch scored in double figures in every game but three during the regular season, helping the Wildcats finish second on the ladder with a 19–9 record. He helped the Wildcats defeat the Gold Coast Blaze 2–1 in the semi-finals to move on to the 2012 NBL Grand Final series. There the Wildcats faced the New Zealand Breakers, but despite Lisch averaging 19 points per game in the series, the Wildcats were defeated 2–1.

Prior to the start of the finals, Lisch was named the recipient of the Andrew Gaze Trophy as the NBL's most valuable player for the 2011–12 season. Lisch, who was also named in the All-NBL First Team, became just the second Wildcats player to win the league's top individual honour after former captain Paul Rogers in 2000. He appeared in all 34 games for the Wildcats in 2011–12, averaging 17.3 points, 3.7 rebounds and 3.2 assists per game.

2012–13 season
Following his MVP season, Lisch received increased physical attention from defenders and became an obvious target for opposition defences. However, he remained among the league's top ten scorers; the extra defensive attention also created more scoring opportunities for teammates like Matt Knight. Over the first half of the 2012–13 season, Lisch was named Player of the Week for Round 8 and earned selection to the South All-Stars team as the starting shooting guard for the 2012 NBL All-Star Game. However, he was forced to withdraw after being diagnosed with a Grade 2 groin strain. Additionally, against the Townsville Crocodiles on October 14, Lisch played his 100th consecutive NBL game which, not coincidentally, was Rob Beveridge's 100th game for the Wildcats as coach. Lisch became the first player since Darryl McDonald 15 years earlier to achieve 100 consecutive games. Over the second half of the season, he set a season high with 26 points against the Cairns Taipans on January 5, and on February 4, he was named to the Perth Wildcats 30th Anniversary All-Star team. Lisch scored in double figures in every game but five during the regular season, helping the Wildcats finish second on the ladder with a 22–6 record. He helped the Wildcats sweep the Wollongong Hawks in the semi-finals to move on to the 2013 NBL Grand Final series. There the Wildcats once again faced the New Zealand Breakers, only to lose the series in straight sets.

Prior to the start of the finals, Lisch was named in the All-NBL First Team for the second straight year. He was later named the Wildcats' MVP for the third straight year. He appeared in all 32 games for the Wildcats in 2012–13, averaging 15.2 points, 2.8 rebounds and 3.0 assists per game.

In late May 2013, Lisch and coach Rob Beveridge parted ways with the Wildcats after four seasons. In each of the Wildcats' 130 outings since the beginning of the 2009–10 season, both Lisch and Beveridge took to the floor in every contest. Lisch ended his four-year tenure in Perth to pursue his European aspirations, finishing with career averages of 14.6 points, 3.1 rebounds and 2.7 assists per game.

Puerto Rico (2013)
Following the conclusion of the 2012–13 NBL season, Lisch joined Piratas de Quebradillas of the Baloncesto Superior Nacional (BSN) alongside former Wildcats teammate Shawn Redhage. He went on to lead the team to their first championship in over 30 years, beating Ponce Lions in six games in the best-of-seven BSN finals series. Lisch was named MVP of the series after recording 20 points, nine rebounds and five assists in Game 6. In 35 games for Quebradillas, he averaged 16.6 points, 3.6 rebounds, 4.9 assists and 1.6 steals per game.

Europe (2013–2015)
On July 6, 2013, Lisch signed a one-year deal with French team JSF Nanterre. There he teamed-up with his brother-in-law, Trenton Meacham. However, due to a broken finger, he was unable to debut for Nanterre until January. He appeared in 11 league games for Nanterre in 2013–14, averaging 8.6 points, 2.6 rebounds, 1.7 assists and 1.3 steals per game. He also appeared in eight Eurocup games, averaging 7.1 points, 2.1 rebounds, 1.8 assists and 1.5 steals per game. In May 2014, he helped Nanterre win the French Cup, scoring four points in the 55–50 win over SLUC Nancy in the final.

In June 2014, Lisch parted ways with Nanterre and signed with Spanish team CAI Zaragoza. He appeared in 34 league games for Zaragoza in 2014–15, averaging 6.4 points, 1.5 rebounds and 2.6 assists per game. He also appeared in 15 Eurocup games, averaging 6.0 points, 1.1 rebounds and 3.4 assists per game.

Following the 2014–15 season, Zaragoza offered to renew Lisch's contract, but he declined in order to return to Australia.

Illawarra Hawks (2015–2016)
On July 6, 2015, Lisch signed with the Illawarra Hawks for the 2015–16 season, returning to the Australian National Basketball League for a second stint and re-joining his former Wildcats mentor, Rob Beveridge, at the Hawks. In his debut for the Hawks on October 8, 2015, Lisch contributed seven points before hobbling off the court during the third quarter of their game against the Cairns Taipans with a knee injury. He watched the remainder of the game from the bench with his right knee in a brace, and subsequently missed the Hawks' next three games. He returned to action on October 25 to face his former team, the Perth Wildcats, for the first time. Making his first appearance for the Hawks at home, Lisch recorded 15 points and seven assists in a 106–99 loss to the Wildcats.

On January 7, 2016, Lisch was named NBL Player of the Month for December after leading the Hawks to five wins in six games and averaging 22.7 points, 4.3 assists and 3.8 rebounds per game throughout the month. On January 17, he scored a career-high 40 points in a 103–96 double-overtime win over the New Zealand Breakers in Auckland. Four days later, he played his 150th NBL game in a loss to the Wildcats in Perth.

Lisch helped the Hawks finish the regular season in third place with a 17–11 record, which set them up to play the second-seeded Perth Wildcats in the semi-finals. Their chances of defeating the Wildcats were weakened when Lisch went down heavily on his left ankle late in the first quarter of Game 1 in Perth and did not return, only coming back to the team's bench in the second half in a moon boot on crutches. The Wildcats subsequently took Game 1. The injury ruled Lisch out of Game 2, but the Hawks managed to rally at home to even the series. He recovered in time to face the Wildcats in Game 3; however, despite Lisch's return, the Hawks were defeated 89–74, as they bowed out of the finals with a 2–1 series loss.

Prior to the start of the finals, Lisch was named the recipient of the Andrew Gaze Trophy as the NBL's most valuable player for the 2015–16 season. Lisch, who was also named NBL Best Defensive Player and All-NBL First Team, became just the second player in league history to win the award with two different teams. He also became the fourth Hawks player to win the award, joining Mike Jones (1981), Gary Ervin (2011) and Rotnei Clarke (2014), while becoming only the sixth player in NBL history to have been named MVP in multiple seasons, joining Andrew Gaze (7), Scott Fisher (2), Leroy Loggins (2), Robert Rose (2) and Chris Anstey (2). In 27 games for the Hawks in 2015–16, he averaged 19.4 points, 3.5 rebounds, 3.3 assists and 1.8 steals per game.

Second stint in Puerto Rico (2016)
On February 1, 2016, Lisch signed with Puerto Rican team Piratas de Quebradillas, returning to the team for a second stint. He arrived in Puerto Rico in early April, debuting on April 4 against San Germán. On May 2, he scored a season-high 32 points in a 99–95 double-overtime loss to Santeros de Aguada. In 20 games for Quebradillas in 2016, Lisch averaged 14.8 points, 3.9 rebounds, 5.4 assists and 1.3 steals per game.

Sydney Kings (2016–2020)

2016–17 season
On April 1, 2016, it was announced that Lisch had turned down a contract extension with the Illawarra Hawks, and that a rival NBL team was his next destination. A day later, the Sydney Kings announced Lisch as their first major signing for the 2016–17 season, with Lisch having inked a three-year deal. It marked the second significant signing for the Kings, with Australian basketball icon, Andrew Gaze, having joined the team as its new head coach. The signing of Lisch, along with the appointment of Gaze as head coach, set the Kings up to lure more quality free agents to a club that had seen its struggles since returning to the league in 2010, capped off by a 6–22 record in 2015–16. A bonus for the Kings was that Lisch became an Australian citizen in March 2016, meaning the team could use its three import slots without Lisch filling one of them. In the weeks leading up to the start of the 2016–17 season, Lisch was appointed team captain.

In his debut for the Kings in their season opener on October 8, 2016, Lisch scored a game-high 20 points in a 77–73 loss to the Brisbane Bullets. On November 12, 2016, he scored a season-high 30 points in an 87–71 win over Melbourne United. By mid-November, Lisch had led the Kings to atop the NBL ladder behind his 18 points per game, leading to Andrew Gaze and teammate Steve Blake citing that Lisch was good enough to play in the NBA.

The Kings were title favourites following Round 5, having moved to a 5–1 record after a win over the Brisbane Bullets, with Lisch performing at an MVP level for the relaunched Kings. However, things began to deteriorate after that. The Kings' 'front-heavy' home schedule began to catch up to them, Steve Blake suddenly returned to the U.S. with a personal issue, and Lisch seemingly started to burn out. By Round 11, the Kings had slipped from the top spot, and by Round 14 they were no longer among the top four. The Kings missed the finals in 2016–17 after losing nine of their final twelve games, finishing seventh on the ladder with a 13–15 record. Lisch appeared in 27 out of the Kings' 28 games, averaging 16.5 points, 3.5 rebounds, 3.7 assists and 1.9 steals per game. His lone missed game came on October 30 against Brisbane due to a minor leg injury.

2017–18 season
Lisch's production dropped off as the 2016–17 season came to a close, with the Kings' management putting it down to a mixture of niggling injuries, his workload, and the fact that he'd just come off an Olympic campaign with the Australian Boomers in August 2016. Aimed at resolving a nagging injury that curtailed his performance in 2016–17, Lisch underwent minor knee surgery during the off-season. The Kings remained confident during the 2017 off-season that Lisch was the man for the job, despite calls for the team to go after the likes of Jerome Randle or Casper Ware. After an off-season of rest and a training schedule refinement, Lisch entered the 2017–18 season ready to redeem himself.

On September 28, 2017, Lisch and the Kings flew to Salt Lake City in the United States to face the Utah Jazz in a historic pre-season game on October 2, marking the first time an NBL team has travelled to the U.S. to play an NBA team. Lisch scored 13 points in the 108–83 loss.

Lisch was described early in the season as "simply not a point guard" after starting at the point in the first three games. The Kings' offence looked disorganised in the preseason, as well as the beginning of the regular season, and things only got worse when Lisch went down with a calf tear. In just the third game of the season on October 15 against the Illawarra Hawks, Lisch left the game in the third quarter with a right calf injury. He was subsequently ruled out for eight weeks with a grade two tear. Lisch was on track to return to action on December 17 against the Cairns Taipans after re-joining the full squad at training at the seven-week mark. However, he re-injured his calf at training on December 13. The Kings struggled defensively in Lisch's absence and sat at the bottom of the NBL ladder for much of the season. He returned to the active roster in mid-January after missing 17 games. In his return game on January 13, Lisch recorded seven points and four rebounds in 15 minutes off the bench before fouling out of the Kings' 104–101 loss to the Adelaide 36ers. On February 15, he scored a season-high 18 points in a 90–73 win over the Brisbane Bullets. Playing alongside mid-season signing Jerome Randle, Lisch helped the Kings to six wins in their last seven games. Despite the late season surge, the Kings missed the finals with an 11–17 record. In 11 games, Lisch averaged 11.1 points, 3.2 rebounds, 2.4 assists and 1.5 steals per game.

2018–19 season
In 2018, Lisch utilised the off-season by not going anywhere to play. He stayed in Sydney and concentrated on getting healthy. On September 30, 2018, Lisch scored 16 points in a 110–91 loss to the Los Angeles Clippers in a pre-season clash in Hawaii. On October 28, he scored a season-high 22 points with five 3-pointers in a 98–90 overtime win over the Cairns Taipans. On November 2, in his 200th NBL game, Lisch had 12 points, five rebounds, three assists and two blocks in an 86–79 win over the Illawarra Hawks. After colliding with a teammate and sustaining an elbow to his jaw at training on November 17, Lisch missed the Kings' game the following day. Lisch helped the Kings finish the regular season in third place with an 18–10 record, before going on to lose 2–0 to Melbourne United in the semi-finals. In 29 games, he averaged 14.1 points, 2.5 rebounds, 3.2 assists and 1.4 steals per game.

2019–20 season
On March 29, 2019, Lisch re-signed with the Kings on a multi-year deal. He had opportunities to join the South East Melbourne Phoenix and the Illawarra Hawks during the off-season but decided to take a pay cut and re-commit to the Kings. Lisch suffered a left ankle fracture in Round 2 of the 2019–20 season and was subsequently ruled out for two months. He returned to action in Round 10, but further ankle soreness saw him miss the next six rounds. He returned to the line-up once again on February 1 against the Perth Wildcats after two months on the sidelines. He played the final three games of the regular season to help the Kings win the minor premiership with a first-place finish and a 20–8 record. The Kings went on to defeat Melbourne United 2–1 in the semi-finals to reach the NBL Grand Final. In game one of the grand final series against the Wildcats, Lisch scored 17 points in an 88–86 loss. The best-of-five grand final series was called off by Sydney, with the Kings down 2–1, due to the coronavirus pandemic. The Kings were subsequently deemed runners-up for the season.

Lisch's ankle injury early in the season led to an exacerbation of a pre-existing ankle condition. He subsequently underwent surgery following the season, with the recommendation from multiple medical specialists being that he should avoid further impact activities following the surgery. As a result, on June 9, 2020, Lisch announced his retirement from basketball.

National team career
In May 2016, Lisch was named in the Australian national team's 17-man squad for a selection camp in Melbourne in July ahead of the Rio Olympics. He was subsequently named in the final 12-man squad, joining former Perth Wildcats teammate Damian Martin as Olympic debutants. Lisch became the first Olympic basketball player from SLU since Pete McCaffrey (1964) and Dick Boushka (1956). Lisch was a key reserve for the Boomers during their Olympic campaign, helping Australia reach the bronze medal game. There the Boomers lost a closely contested game to Spain. Australia's fourth-place finish matched their best-ever finish in the Olympics. Lisch appeared in all eight games for Australia, averaging 2.6 points, 1.6 rebounds and 1.5 assists in 14 minutes per game. He scored seven points in Australia's opening game win against France, and had six rebounds in the bronze medal game against Spain.

In June 2017, Lisch was named in a 20-man Boomers training camp squad ahead of the 2017 FIBA Asia Cup. However, due to injury, he was not named in the final 12-man squad. Lisch returned to the Boomers squad in February 2018 for the FIBA World Cup qualifiers. He continued on with the Boomers for their final World Cup qualifying matches in June.

Coaching career

In December 2020, Lisch was appointed assistant coach and player welfare manager of the Sydney Kings for the 2020–21 NBL season under head coach Adam Forde. In July 2021, he was re-appointed assistant coach of the Kings for the 2021–22 NBL season under new coach Chase Buford. He helped the Kings win the championship in May 2022. In December 2022, he made his NBL head coaching debut, assuming the head coaching responsibilities for a round 13 game against the Tasmania JackJumpers after Buford was suspended for one game.

Personal life
Lisch is the son of Rusty and Cathy Lisch. His father was a standout prep basketball player before choosing football and going on to play in the National Football League (NFL) as a quarterback. Lisch has an older sister Stephanie, a younger sister Theresa, and a younger brother Daniel.

Lisch and his Australian wife Rachel married in 2012. The couple met while Rachel was playing for the West Coast Waves in the Women's National Basketball League (WNBL). They have four children: Benjamin, Sofia, and twins Isabel and Isaac.

Lisch holds an Italian passport thanks to his mother's Italian heritage. He first applied for an Italian passport in 2011. In March 2016, he became an Australian citizen.

References

External links

NBL profile
EuroCup profile
Spanish League profile
Basket Zaragoza profile
FIBA profile
"Cats MVP Lisch can only get better: Beveridge" at thewest.com.au
"Wildcats' Lisch dilemma" at thewest.com.au
"NBL: League MVP Kevin Lisch looks forward to Australian citizenship" at smh.com.au

1986 births
Living people
American expatriate basketball people in Australia
American expatriate basketball people in France
American expatriate basketball people in Spain
American men's basketball coaches
American men's basketball players
Australian men's basketball coaches
Australian men's basketball players
Baloncesto Superior Nacional players
Basketball players at the 2016 Summer Olympics
Basketball players from Illinois
Basket Zaragoza players
Australian expatriate basketball people in Puerto Rico
Illawarra Hawks players
Nanterre 92 players
Liga ACB players
Olympic basketball players of Australia
Perth Wildcats players
Piratas de Quebradillas players
Point guards
Saint Louis Billikens men's basketball players
Shooting guards
Sportspeople from Belleville, Illinois
Sydney Kings players
Australian people of Italian descent
American emigrants to Australia
American people of Italian descent